The 2019–20 ASVEL Basket season will be the 71st season in the existence of the club. The club will play in the LNB Pro A and in the EuroLeague for the first time in 9 years. 

It will be the second season under head coach Zvezdan Mitrović.

Players

Squad information

Players with multiple nationalities

Depth chart

Transactions

In

Out

References

External links
 Official website 

ASVEL Basket seasons
ASVEL
ASVEL